Monte Cinto (Colli Euganei) is a hill of the Veneto, Italy.

Mountains of Veneto